Børge Kjær Monberg (August 24, 1905 – June 19, 1990) was a Danish field hockey player who competed in the 1928 Summer Olympics.

He was born in Jægersborg, Gentofte and died in Kalundborg.

In 1928 he was a member of the Danish team which was eliminated in the first round of the Olympic tournament after two wins and two losses. He played all four matches as back.

External links
 
 profile

1905 births
1990 deaths
Danish male field hockey players
Olympic field hockey players of Denmark
Field hockey players at the 1928 Summer Olympics
People from Kalundborg
People from Gentofte Municipality
Sportspeople from Region Zealand
Sportspeople from the Capital Region of Denmark